The following is a list of the 21 cantons of the Sarthe department, in France, following the French canton reorganisation which came into effect in March 2015:

Bonnétable
Changé
Écommoy
La Ferté-Bernard
La Flèche
Loué
Le Lude
Mamers
Le Mans-1
Le Mans-2
Le Mans-3
Le Mans-4
Le Mans-5
Le Mans-6
Le Mans-7
Montval-sur-Loir
Sablé-sur-Sarthe
Saint-Calais
Savigné-l'Évêque
Sillé-le-Guillaume
La Suze-sur-Sarthe

References